David William Ragan, Jr. (August 7, 1935 – March 13, 2018) was an American professional golfer who played on the PGA Tour and the Senior PGA Tour.

Ragan was born in Daytona Beach, Florida. He attended the University of Florida in Gainesville, Florida, where he played for the Florida Gators men's golf team in National Collegiate Athletics Association (NCAA) competition from 1954 to 1956.  During his time as a Gator golfer, he was a member of the Gators team that finished sixth in the NCAA national tournament in 1955, and won the first two Southeastern Conference (SEC) championships in team history in 1955 and 1956. As a senior in 1956, he won the SEC individual championship, and was recognized as an All-American. Ragan was later inducted into the University of Florida Athletic Hall of Fame as a "Gator Great."

Ragan turned professional in 1956 and played on the PGA Tour in the late 1950s and 1960s, winning three times. He finished second to Jack Nicklaus in the 1963 PGA Championship. He was a member of the 1963 Ryder Cup team.

In the early 1980s, he was the coach for the Tennessee Temple Crusaders golf team of Tennessee Temple University in Chattanooga, Tennessee.  He was also the coach of the Ragin' Cajuns golf team at University of Southwestern Louisiana in Lafayette, Louisiana.  From 1984 to 1986, he worked in partnership with Jack Wall and Bobby Greenwood at the Master's School of Golf. He played sparingly on the Senior PGA Tour starting in 1987.

Golf Digest magazine recognized Ragan as one of the top golf instructors in the state of Alabama in 2007. He worked for many years as a teaching pro at Inverness Country Club in Birmingham, Alabama. He taught at Pine Tree Country Club in Irondale, AL (near Birmingham) from 1995 to 1998. His son, Dave III, is a teaching pro in Miami. Another one of his sons, Chuck is a singer/songwriter, as well as the frontman for the punk rock group Hot Water Music.

Ragan died on March 13, 2018, aged 82 years.

Professional wins (9)

PGA Tour (3)

PGA Tour playoff record (1–0)

Other (6)
This list is possibly incomplete
1956 Florida Open (as an amateur)
1957 Waterloo Open Golf Classic (tie with J. C. Goosie)
1961 Haig & Haig Scotch Foursome (with Mickey Wright)
1962 Florida PGA Championship
1963 Haig & Haig Scotch Foursome (with Mickey Wright), Senior Service Tournament

U.S. national team appearances
Professional
Ryder Cup: 1963 (winners)

See also 

List of American Ryder Cup golfers
List of Florida Gators men's golfers on the PGA Tour
List of University of Florida alumni
List of University of Florida Athletic Hall of Fame members

References

External links 

American male golfers
Florida Gators men's golfers
PGA Tour golfers
PGA Tour Champions golfers
Ryder Cup competitors for the United States
College golf coaches in the United States
Golfers from Florida
Golfers from Alabama
Tennessee Temple University
Louisiana Ragin' Cajuns coaches
Sportspeople from Daytona Beach, Florida
1935 births
2018 deaths